Lust 'n Rust: the trailer park musical is a play written by Frank Haney, Carol Kimball and Dave Stratton.

Synopsis 

Lust 'n Rust relates the story of Steve, a New Jersey-native corporate manager who is transferred to a small Southern Illinois town to run the local Agribig food processing plant. He moves into the Redbud mobile estates and meets the quirky characters that live in the park. Meeting Connie, a neighbor in the park that waits tables at Smitty's Diner, quickly complicates Steve's life. Connie is splitting up with her soon-to-be ex-husband Duane, who is trying to gain Connie's forgiveness for an unfortunate incident. Steve's life is made more difficult when his boss at Agribig hands him his most difficult assignment yet, one that could have a disastrous effect on the local economy.

Productions 

Lust 'n Rust has been performed by the following companies:
 Theatre Building in Chicago
 Patuxtent Playhouse
 Mercer Community College
 Valley Repertory Company

Musical numbers 

 Mobilized - Steve Morgan
 Look Away - Steve Morgan and Connie Nichols
 Redbud Mobile Estates - Red, Tanya, Junior, Buzz, Connie, Duane, Latisha, Janette
 Double Wide - Red and Latisha
 What We're Doin - Tanya and Buzz
 Let Her Go - Duane Kroesser
 Bigger Than Yours - Connie Nichols
 Once Upon A Time - Steve Morgan
 They Say - Connie Nichols
 Cajun Cooking - Latisha and Buzz
 Off To Mexico - Steve Morgan and Duane Kroesser
 Over and Done - Steve Morgan and Connie Nichols
 Mobilized (reprise) - All

Critical reviews 

The Calvert county press declared the Patuxtent Playhouse production a hit and an entertaining evening out. The Journal Inquirer had high praise for the Valley Repertory production, stating, "For an excellent night of entertainment with a remarkable collection of talent under one roof, see the Valley Repertory Company's production of "Lust 'n Rust — The Trailer Park Musical."

Cast 

Chicago premiere production

Patuxtent Playhouse

Mercer Community College

Valley Repertory Company

References 

2001 musicals